John Stanier  is an American drummer who is best known for his work with alternative metal band Helmet. He currently plays in experimental rock band Battles and has previously performed with Tomahawk and The Mark of Cain, as well as performing on several releases as a studio musician.

He is known for his speed, endurance, and precision as a performer. Stanier uses a Tama Artstar II drum kit.

Biography 

Stanier grew up in Pittsburgh, Pennsylvania and Florida and is a veteran of the local hardcore music scene. He is known for having a drum corps background, but never actually marched a summer season. He played tenor drums for the Florida Wave Drum and Bugle Corps through a few years of their winter/spring camps. He studied orchestral percussion at the University of South Florida, but never took formal drum set lessons. Stanier cites Neil Peart as his biggest influence. He has also been influenced by drummers such as John Bonham, Billy Cobham, Bill Bruford, Terry Bozzio, Carl Palmer, and Lenny White. Stanier's drumming with Helmet has been cited as a big influence on a new generation of rock drummers. He endorses Tama drums, and is also well known for his Zildjian K crash cymbal perched as high as it can go when playing with Battles.

The breakup of Helmet in 1998 was supposedly amicable, though Stanier offers few details beyond: "There's no big story or anything. It was just... time to call it a day. We'd been around for 10 years... no drama or fights or anything like that." Stanier has not kept in contact with former band mates Page Hamilton and Henry Bogdan, and Hamilton has commented that Stanier ignored attempts to communicate. With Helmet firmly in the past, Stanier wanted to get involved with other projects after taking some time off. A big fan of hip-hop music, he "accidentally" became a professional DJ for a year and a half. The length of his drumming inactivity was in part due to a broken wrist, as well as the fact that he simply could not find a band he wanted to play with. Since 2000, Stanier has been much more active with drumming. He is currently a member of three bands: Battles, Tomahawk, and The Mark of Cain.

Discography

As a band member 

 Helmet – Strap It On (1990)
 Helmet – Meantime (1992)
 Helmet – Betty (1994)
 Helmet – Born Annoying (1995)
 Helmet – Aftertaste (1997)
 Helmet – Unsung: The Best of Helmet (1991–1997) (2004)
 The Mark of Cain – This Is This (2001)
 The Mark of Cain – Songs of the Third and Fifth (2012)
 Tomahawk – Tomahawk (2001)
 Tomahawk – Mit Gas (2003)
 Tomahawk – Anonymous (2007)
 Tomahawk – Oddfellows (2013)
 Tomahawk – Tonic Immobility (2021)
 Battles – EP C / B EP (2006)
 Battles – Mirrored (2007)
 Battles – Gloss Drop (2011)
 Battles – La Di Da Di (2015)
Battles – Juice B Crypts (2019)

As a studio contributor 

 Pitchshifter – Deviant (2000)
 Primer 55 – (the) New Release (2001)
 Align – Some Breaking News (2001)
 Cage – Weatherproof (2003)
 Melissa Auf der Maur – Auf der Maur (2004)
 Primer 55 – Family for Life (2007)
 Prefuse 73 – Preparations (2007)
 The Field – Yesterday and Today (2009)
 Rone – Tohu Bonus (2013), in the track "Pool"
 Rone – Mirapolis (2017), in both "Brest" and "Lou" tracks

References 
 Micallef, Ken "Up and Coming: John Stanier of Helmet", Modern Drummer, October 1994.
 Farmilo, Troy "band bio", The Helmet Home Page (defunct), August 2001.
 Worley, Gail "Weapon of Choice: An Interview with John Stanier of Tomahawk", Ink 19, January 2004.

Living people
Musicians from Baltimore
Stanier, John
American rock drummers
Noise rock musicians
Post-hardcore musicians
Helmet (band) members
Alternative metal musicians
Battles (band) members
Tomahawk (band) members
20th-century American drummers
American male drummers
20th-century American male musicians
1968 births